Events from the year 1712 in Canada.

Incumbents
French Monarch: Louis XIV
British and Irish Monarch: Anne

Governors
Governor General of New France: Philippe de Rigaud Vaudreuil
Colonial Governor of Louisiana: Jean-Baptiste Le Moyne de Bienville
Governor of Nova Scotia: Samuel Vetch then Francis Nicholson
Governor of Plaisance: Philippe Pastour de Costebelle

Events
 1712-34 - Fox resistance against the French in the Great Lakes area. Fox Wars begin.

References

 
Canada
12